King's Highway 400A, once known as the Highway 400 Extension, was a 400-series highway in the Canadian province of Ontario that was unsigned and is now the southern end of Highway 11. The short  freeway link connected Highway 400 with Highway 11 and Simcoe County Road 93, formerly Highway 93. The highway was created in late 1959 by the opening of Highway 400 to Coldwater, although it has always featured Highway 400 signage in the southbound direction and Highway 11 signage northbound.

Route description  
On average, the highway is used by approximately 11,900 vehicles daily. The route began as Highway 400 exits on the right, with the northbound lanes rising up to cross Highway 400A on an overpass. After the overpass, the highway ascends, with grasslands to the east and an embankment to the west, then gently curves to the northeast. As it crosses Simcoe County Road 93 (Penetanguishene Road), formerly Highway 93, the former highway ended as it continued as Highway 11.

History 
Highway 400A formed the original routing of Highway 400 from 1950 to 1959. In 1950, the then-incomplete freeway was extended north through the city of Barrie to the junction of Highway 11 and Highway 93 in Crown Hill; the entirety of Highway 400 would open on Dominion Day in 1952. In the late-1950s, the construction of the Trans-Canada Highway prompted the Department of Highways to extend the route north to Highway 12 and Highway 103 (both designated as branch routes of the TCH) in Coldwater, deemed the Highway 400 Extension. This section opened as a super two on December 24, 1959, redirecting Highway 400 southwest of the Crown Hill junction. To remedy this situation, the  gap between the original terminus and the new turnoff was internally designated as Highway 400A.

The highway has never been signed as Highway 400A. Instead, northbound it is indicated as Highway 11 and southbound as Highway 400.
Restructuring of the provincial highway system resulted in Highway 11 south of the Crown Hill interchange being transferred, or downloaded, to local municipalities on April 1, 1997.
That highway's southern terminus was then shifted to meet Highway 400 by redesignating Highway 400A as Highway 11.

Unusually, traffic to and from the Highway 400 extension enters and exits at the right of the roadway, while traffic to and from Highway 400A/11 simply continues on the same roadway. The interchange is also incomplete; drivers must either use the Forbes Road and Penetanguishene Road interchanges, or continue southbound into Barrie and switch direction at Duckworth Street in order to travel from southbound Highway 400A to northbound Highway 400 or from southbound Highway 400 to northbound Highway 400A.

Exit list

References 

Sources

Bibliography

00A